Plumwood can refer to:

Plants
 Endiandra virens
 Eucryphia moorei
 Pouteria myrsinoides, yellow plumwood
 Terminalia grandiflora

People
 Val Plumwood (1939–2008), Australian ecofeminist philosopher and activist

Places
 Plumwood, Ohio

See also
 Prunus, plum trees